David Luechtefeld (born November 8, 1940) is a former Republican member of the Illinois Senate, representing the 58th district from September 1995 until January 2017. During his tenure, he served as the Deputy Minority Leader.

Early life
Luechtefeld was born November 8, 1940 in Lively Grove, Illinois. He graduated high school from Okawville High School in 1958 and earned his bachelor's degree from St. Louis University in 1962. He taught and coached basketball at Okawville High School until he retired in 1993.

Illinois Senate
In September 1995, Luechtefeld was appointed state senator for the 58th district to fill the vacancy left by the resignation of 81-year-old Senator Ralph A. Dunn, who resigned to take care of his wife while taking a position with the Illinois State Treasurer's office. The 58th district included all or portions of St. Clair, Monroe, Washington, Randolph, Jackson and Union counties in Downstate Illinois.

In 1996, Luechtefeld ran against SIU political science professor Barb Brown in what became the most expensive and closest state legislative race of the entire cycle with Brown down by only 127 votes. Controversially, on election night, Monroe County election judges failed to initial approximately 500 ballots. Brown asked for a recount. By state law the decision was left in the hands of the Illinois Senate. The Republican majority Senate seated Luechtefeld. In 1998, Brown ran against Luechtefeld again, but lost by a larger margin. Since then, Luechtefeld has never received less than 60% of the vote.

His committee assignments at one point included Agriculture, Education, Executive, Financial Institutions, and Higher Education. He served as the minority spokesperson on the Education and Higher Education committees. He was also a member of the  Subcommittee on Election Law. In June 2015, Senator Luechtefeld announced his retirement after twenty years in Springfield.

Post-Senate activities
On March 6, 2017, Bruce Rauner appointed Luechtefeld to the Illinois Civil Service Commission for a term expiring March 1, 2023. The Commission is tasked to review and approve rule changes to the Illinois Personnel Code, position classifications, and pay plans proposed by Department of Central Management Services, which administers state's merit employment system. It also acts as an impartial review board for employees who appeal department decisions.

References

External links
Biography, bills and committees at the 98th Illinois General Assembly
By session: 99th, 98th, 97th, 96th, 95th, 94th, 93rd
State Senator David Luechtefeld constituency site
 

1940 births
Living people
People from Washington County, Illinois
Republican Party Illinois state senators
Southern Illinois University Edwardsville alumni
Saint Louis University alumni
21st-century American politicians